Chada Suresh Reddy is an Indian politician. He was elected to the Lok Sabha, the lower house of the Parliament of India from Hanamkonda as a member of the Telugu Desam Party.

References

External links
 Official biographical sketch on the Parliament of India website

1959 births
Living people
Telugu Desam Party politicians
Lok Sabha members from Andhra Pradesh
India MPs 1998–1999
India MPs 1999–2004